An apostrophe is a punctuation mark, represented as ’ or '.

Apostrophe may also refer to:
 Apostrophe (figure of speech), an address to a person or personified object not present
 Apostrophe ('), a 1974 album by Frank Zappa
 "Apostrophe", a song by The Doubleclicks from the 2010 album Chainmail and Cello
 Apostrophes (talk show), a French television program about books
 Apostrophes: A Book of Tributes to Masters of Music, a 1910 book

See also
 ' and ’ glyphs, each used for apostrophe and other uses.
 Apostrophe Island
 Apostrophe Protection Society